Bagalakote, is a city in the state of Karnataka, India, which is also the headquarters of Bagalakote district. It is situated on branch of River Ghataprabha about 481 km (299 mi) northwest of state capital Bengaluru, 410 km (255 mi) southwest of Hyderabad, and about 570 km (354 mi) southeast of Mumbai.
bagracotta 1832
baugeracotta

History

Existence of the city
According to stone inscriptions in the surrounding area, the town's name was formerly Bagadige. According to legend, the town was given to the Bhajantries (musicians) by Ravana, the king of Lanka who ruled this area. One of the Bijapur Adil Shahi king Ibrahim Adil Shah II is said to have presented the town to his daughter as bangle money (a tradition in which the daughter is given money to buy bangles, sarees, and gold ornaments from her parents after the marriage).

Rulers
Bagalkot remained under successive dominions of Vijayanagar emperors, Bijapur Adil Shahi, Peshwas, Kingdom of Mysore, Maratha rulers, and finally the British in 1818. In 1865, it was established as a municipality and civic amenities were provided to the residents of Bagalkot.

Geography
It is situated on the bank of the river Ghataprabha.

Demographics

At the time of the 2011 census, Bagalkot had a population of 111,933. Bagalkot city has a sex ratio of 985 females to males and a literacy rate of 85.40%. Scheduled Castes and Scheduled Tribes made up 10.33% and 3.78% of the population respectively.

At the time of the 2011 census, 69.10% of the population spoke Kannada, 22.15% Urdu, 3.94% Marathi and 1.07% Hindi as their first language.

Gallery

References

External links
Bagalakot district Official site
Bagalakote City Municipal Council
Bagalakot Town Development Authority

Cities and towns in Bagalkot district
Cities in Karnataka